Kahlon is a surname. Other spellings of this name include Kahloon, Kahloun, Cahloon and Cahlon. The name has multiple origins including German, Israelí, Irish, Indo-Scythian, Hebrew, and Jat.

Notable people with the surname include:
Moshe Kahlon (born 1960), Israeli politician
Mumtaz Kahloon (born 1956), Pakistani politician, businessman, and philanthropist
Or Kahlon, Israeli television personality and dancer
Ravi Kahlon, Canadian athlete, politician and government minister
Tamir Kahlon (born 1987), Israeli soccer player
Viki Kahlon (born 1993), Israeli soccer player

See also

 Kahlon, SBS Nagar, village in Punjab, India

References

Jat clans of Punjab
Indian surnames
Hindu surnames
Punjabi-language surnames
Punjabi tribes